Anthony Peck (born Carmen Anthony Pecchio; March 20, 1947 – July 20, 1996) was an American actor. He was born in Youngstown, Ohio.

He earned his Bachelor of Arts at the University of Toledo, and his Master of Fine Arts in Acting from Temple University.

He appeared in several of John McTiernan's films, such as Die Hard, The Hunt for Red October, Last Action Hero, and Die Hard with a Vengeance. Other appearances include Creator, Unbecoming Age, In the Line of Fire, The Enemy Within, and Carnosaur 3: Primal Species.

He also appeared in many television show such as Knots Landing, Knight Rider, Dallas, Beauty and the Beast, and Quantum Leap.

Anthony Peck died of cancer on July 30, 1996, at age 49.

Partial filmography

References

External links 
 
 

1947 births
1996 deaths
American male film actors
American male television actors
Male actors from Youngstown, Ohio
Temple University alumni
University of Toledo alumni
Deaths from cancer in California
20th-century American male actors